Stevie Wonder's Journey Through "The Secret Life of Plants" is an album by Stevie Wonder, originally released on the Tamla Motown label on October 30, 1979. It is the soundtrack to the documentary The Secret Life of Plants, directed by Walon Green, which was based on the book of the same name by Peter Tompkins and Christopher Bird. It contains two singles that reached the Billboard Hot 100 charts: "Send One Your Love" (No. 4) and the minor hit "Outside My Window" (No. 52). The single "Black Orchid" reached No. 63 in the UK.

Production 
Wonder created the film score by having Michael Braun, the film's producer, describe each visual image in detail, while the sound engineer, Gary Olazabal, specified the length of a passage. This information was processed to a four-track tape (with the film's sound on one of the tracks), leaving Wonder space to add his own musical accompaniment. Wonder attempted to translate the complex information of the book and film into song lyrics. "Same Old Story," for example, tries to convey the scientific findings of Jagadish Chandra Bose, who developed instruments to measure plants' response to stimuli, and the breakthroughs of African-American agriculturalist George Washington Carver. While written mostly by Stevie Wonder, some songs were collaborations with Syreeta Wright, Yvonne Wright, and Michael Sembello.

Journey Through "The Secret Life of Plants" contained new synthesizer combinations, including the first use of a digital sampling synthesizer, the Computer Music Melodian, used in most tracks of this album. Journey is an early digital recording, released three months after Ry Cooder's Bop till You Drop, generally believed to be the first digitally recorded popular music album, with this album being the second. Stevie Wonder was an early adherent of the technology and used it for all his subsequent recordings. The music was recorded onto U-matic video tapes using a Sony PCM-1600 digital PCM adaptor, and edited with a digital controller also from Sony.

Packaging 
Tamla/Motown originally released the album as a double LP in a tri-fold sleeve. The front cover was embossed, and following Wonder's recent trend of printing Braille messages on his albums, the cover illustration was captioned below in Braille for blind readers:
⠄⠁⠃⠧ ⠯ ⠔⠎⠊⠙⠑ ⠮ ⠑⠍⠃⠕⠎⠎⠫ ⠎⠟⠥⠜⠑ ⠊⠎ ⠮ ⠳⠞⠇⠔⠑ ⠷ ⠁ ⠋⠇⠪⠻ ⠾ ⠧⠑⠔⠫ ⠇⠂⠧⠑⠎⠲⠠⠌⠑⠧⠊⠑ ⠠⠺⠕⠝⠙⠻⠄⠎ ⠄⠚⠳⠗⠝⠑⠽ ⠄⠐⠹ ⠠⠮ ⠠⠎⠑⠉⠗⠑⠞ ⠠⠇⠊⠋⠑ ⠷ ⠠⠰⠏⠇⠁⠝⠞⠎⠲
"Above and inside the embossed square is the outline of a flower with veined leaves. Stevie Wonder's Journey Through The Secret Life of Plants."
Initial pressings of the album were also scented with a floral perfume.

Release 
After Stevie Wonder's previous albums Innervisions (1973), Fulfillingness' First Finale (1974), and Songs in the Key of Life (1976) all won the Grammy Award for Album of the Year, his next project was highly anticipated, and Motown marketed it aggressively. Although the Secret Life of Plants documentary film never received a wide release, Wonder's soundtrack album went all the way up to number four in the Rock and R&B Billboard charts in 1979 and was also certified platinum by Productores de Música de España, while the single "Send One Your Love" also reached number four. However, sales tapered off quickly, and label head Berry Gordy reportedly complained that the one million copies he pressed turned out to be 900,000 too many.

Promotion
Wonder supported the album in late 1979 with a six-city tour, performing nearly the entire album live with his band Wonderlove and the National Afro-American Philharmonic Orchestra (conducted by James Frazier Jr.). Reflecting the orchestra's presence and the album's atmospheric tone, the tour venues included concert halls and opera houses. The shows began with the Plants music (partially accompanied by film projections), followed by a second half spanning his career hits.

Reception 

Journey Through "The Secret Life of Plants" has sometimes been considered a "vague" and "overambitious" album; it has been called "goofy", "nerdy", "odd", "pointless" and "foolish", and for listeners and critics it was seen as too much of a departure from his string of melodic albums. However, some critics have also described it as "courageous", "achingly sweet", and "bafflingly beautiful". Stephen Holden in a review for the Village Voice remarked that the album has "the painful awkwardness of a barely literate sidewalk sermon", though Wonder "manages to transform even the worst of this drivel into a spiritual jargon that's virtually a different language; his very in-articulateness clears the way for us to tune in to the ineffable, nonrational flow that's his obsession."

Wonder remarked in 2004 that the album "was an experimental project with me scoring and doing other things I like: challenging myself with all the things that entered my mind from the Venus's Flytrap to Earth's creation to coming back as a flower."

The cover of the album was selected by Rolling Stone in 1991 for their list of 100 Classic Album Covers as a memorable example of album art.

Cash Box said "Outside My Window" was a "truly joyous, pastoral love song, utilizing the universal image of the flower to lyrically represent all that is fair and beautiful in nature." Record World said of it that "A deep, dense bassline is mixed alongside Wonder's uplifting vocals on this mid-tempo track."

Solange Knowles named it as an influence on her 2019 album When I Get Home.

KAINA covered the song "Come Back as a Flower" on her 2022 album It Was a Home.

 Track listing 
All tracks written, produced and arranged by Stevie Wonder.

Side one
 "Earth's Creation" – 4:05 (Instrumental)
 "The First Garden" – 2:33 (Instrumental)
 "Voyage to India" – 6:23 (Instrumental)
 "Same Old Story" – 3:45
 "Venus' Flytrap and the Bug" – 2:24
 "Ai No, Sono" – 2:05

Side two
 "Seasons" – 2:53 (Instrumental)
 "Power Flower" – 5:31
 Lyrics by Michael Sembello. "Send One Your Love (Music)" – 3:05 (Instrumental)
 "Race Babbling" – 8:51

Side three
 "Send One Your Love" – 4:02
 "Outside My Window" – 5:29
 "Black Orchid" – 3:48
 Lyrics by Yvonne Wright. "Ecclesiastes" – 3:44 (Instrumental)
 "Kesse Ye Lolo De Ye" – 3:00
 "Come Back as a Flower" – 3:23
 Lead vocals and lyrics by Syreeta Wright.Side four
 "A Seed's a Star/Tree Medley" – 5:41Lyrics by Stevie Wonder and Stephanie Andrews. "The Secret Life of Plants" – 4:28
 "Tree" – 5:55 (Instrumental)
 "Finale" – 6:47 (Instrumental)

 Personnel 
Stevie Wonder – instruments, synthesizer, vocals
Syreeta Wright – vocals on "Come Back as a Flower"
Bill Wolfer, Clark Spangler, Gordon Bahary – synthesizer, sequencer, programming
Ben Bridges, Michael Sembello, Rick Zunigar – guitar
Nathan Watts, Henry Franklin – bass
Ron Kersey – Fender Rhodes on "A Seed's a Star/Tree Medley"
Dennis Davis – electronic drums on "A Seed's a Star/Tree Medley"
Earl DeRouen – congas, bongos, backing vocals on "A Seed's a Star/Tree Medley"
Joe Johnson – bells on "A Seed's a Star/Tree Medley"
Ibrahim Camara – djembe, congas, bells, drums, vocals on "Kesse Ye Lolo De Ye"
Lamine Konté – kora, vocals on "Kesse Ye Lolo De Ye"
Josie James – vocals on "Race Babbling"
Táta Vega – vocals on "A Seed's a Star/Tree Medley"

 Charts 

 Certifications 

 See also 
 Mother Earth's Plantasia'', 1976 album by Mort Garson

References

External links 
 

1979 soundtrack albums
Documentary film soundtracks
Stevie Wonder soundtracks
Tamla Records soundtracks
Albums produced by Stevie Wonder
Albums recorded at Sigma Sound Studios
Albums recorded at Studio in the Country